Jerry de Weerdt (born 3 August 1969) is a Belgian professional stock car racing driver who last competed part-time in the NASCAR Whelen Euro Series Elite 2 division. de Weerdt made 54 Elite 2 division starts between 2014 and 2019, and made a total of 41 Elite 1 division starts between 2013 and 2018. In 2017, he made his NASCAR K&N Pro Series West debut at the Kern County Raceway Park in Bakersfield, California in a No. 14 car owned by Jesse Iwuji's Patriot Motorsports Group team, where he finished 22nd. In January 2018, de Weerdt tested an ARCA Racing Series car at the Daytona International Speedway for Patriot, and was later approved by ARCA to compete in the race there the following month, in which he drove for the same team and would finish 11th in the event.

Motorsports career results

NASCAR
(key) (Bold – Pole position awarded by qualifying time. Italics – Pole position earned by points standings or practice time. * – Most laps led.)

K&N Pro Series West

Whelen Euro Series – Elite 1

Whelen Euro Series – Elite 2

ARCA Racing Series
(key) (Bold – Pole position awarded by qualifying time. Italics – Pole position earned by points standings or practice time. * – Most laps led.)

References

External links
 

Living people
NASCAR drivers
1969 births
Belgian racing drivers
People from Aartselaar
Sportspeople from Antwerp Province